The First Battle of Accra, part of the First British-Ashanti War, was fought in 1824 I what was then the Gold Coast (now Ghana) between some 10,000 Ashantis and an advance party of 500 British troops, under then governor General Sir Charles McCarthy.  The British had no time to prepare and were routed, suffering losses including McCarthy.

See also
 Second Battle of Accra

References

Anglo-Ashanti wars
Conflicts in 1824
1824 in Africa